Paul Dahdah, O.C.D. (born 8 January 1941) is a former bishop of the Apostolic Vicariate of Beirut.

Biography
Dahdah was born in Zgharta, Lebanon. He joined to the Order of the Discalced Carmelites and received on 17 April 1966 his ordination to the priesthood.

Pope John Paul II appointed him Archbishop of Baghdad on 30 May 1983. He received his episcopal consecration of the Apostolic Nuncio in Lebanon, Luciano Angeloni, on 21 August of the same year. His co-consecrators were Raphael I Bidawid, Chaldean Catholic Patriarch of Babylon and Paul Bassim, OCD, Vicar Apostolic Emeritus of Beirut.

On 30 July 1999 he was appointed Vicar Apostolic of Beirut and Titular Bishop of Arae in Numidia.

On 2 August 2016, Pope Francis accepted his age-related resignation.

References

External links

 http://www.catholic-hierarchy.org/bishop/bdahdah.html

1941 births
20th-century Roman Catholic bishops in Lebanon
21st-century Roman Catholic bishops in Lebanon
Discalced Carmelite bishops
Living people
People from Zgharta
Lebanese Roman Catholic bishops